Rhodoglobus aureus is a  Gram-positive and psychrophilic bacterium from the genus Rhodoglobus which has been isolated from a pond from Wright Valley in the Antarctica.

References

Microbacteriaceae
Bacteria described in 2003